Čuvaj me — second studio album of Croatian singer-songwriter Nina Kraljić released in 2020.

Music album 

Nina Kraljić's debut album "Samo" continued the success of "Čuvaj me" released on the last day of 2020. The single "Najljepši dan" included in the album was released in 2018.  Nina Kraljić performed the 2020 song "Zima" together with Marin Jurić Čivro.  The song "Čuvaj me", which gave its name to the second studio album, also brought great success to the singer.  Released on September 8, 2020, lyrics and composition by Boris Kolarić and Maya Kolarić.

Track listing

Release history

Charts 
Chart performance of some songs included in the music album "Cuvaj me" in Croatia charts is shown in the following table:

References 

2020 albums
Nina Kraljić albums